Connor Charles Mosack (born January 20, 1999) is an American professional stock car racing driver. He competes part-time in the NASCAR Xfinity Series, driving the No. 24 Toyota Supra for Sam Hunt Racing and the No. 19 Supra for Joe Gibbs Racing and part-time in the ARCA Menards Series, driving the No. 18 Toyota Camry for JGR.

Racing career

Early Career
Mosack began his career in 2018 at the age of 19, throughout 2018 and 2019 he would win multiple Legends car championships and races.

CARS Solid Rock Carriers Tour/Late Model Racing
In 2019, he made his CARS Tour debut in the season finale at South Boston Speedway for JR Motorsports, he would finish 12th.

In 2020, Mosack signed with JR Motorsports to run full-time in the CARS Tour, he was able to pick up 3 Top 5's, 8 Top 10's and Rookie of the Year honors as he finished 6th in points in a season shortened to only 10 races due to the COVID-19 pandemic. 

In 2021, Mosack would have a reduced Late Model schedule only running 3 races in the CARS Tour and also running the Snowball Derby in addition to a few regional events.

In 2022, Mosack only ran 3 races again in the CARS Tour.

Mosack is set to run 9 select Late Model races in 2023 in addition to his NASCAR and Trans-Am schedule.

ARCA Menards Series

Mosack was tapped to drive the No. 02 for Young's Motorsports on May 10, 2021, for three ARCA Menards Series races that year. Mosack would first make his debut at the 2021 Henry Ford Health System 200, ultimately retiring due to a fuel pump problem and finishing 16th. He would make two more starts that season, finishing with a best of 11th at the 2021 Reese's 150. 

In 2022, Mosack was announced to drive in ten races for Bret Holmes Racing.

ARCA Menards Series East
Mosack would make his debut in the ARCA Menards Series East in the 2021 General Tire 125, driving the No. 02 for Young's Motorsports, finishing seventh. He would make one more start in the 2021 season, in a combination race with the ARCA Menards Series, finishing 16th.

Trans Am TA2 Series
Connor Mosack competed in a full season of Trans Am in the TA2 class for Scott Lagasse Racing in 2021. In 14 starts, he had 10 top 5's, 6 podiums, and 1 win at Watkins Glen. He competed for another full season in 2022.

NASCAR Xfinity Series
On May 25, 2022, Joe Gibbs Racing announced that Mosack would make his Xfinity Series debut in their No. 18 car in the road course race at Portland. Mosack was announced as the driver for Sam Hunt Racing's No. 26 car at Watkins Glen International.

NASCAR Camping World Truck Series
On June 30, 2022, Bret Holmes Racing announced that Mosack would make his Truck Series debut in the team's No. 32 truck in the race at Mid-Ohio Sports Car Course.

Personal life
Mosack graduated from High Point University with a degree in business entrepreneurship in 2021.

Motorsports career results

NASCAR
(key) (Bold – Pole position awarded by qualifying time. Italics – Pole position earned by points standings or practice time. * – Most laps led.)

Xfinity Series

Camping World Truck Series

 Season still in progress
 Ineligible for series points

ARCA Menards Series
(key) (Bold – Pole position awarded by qualifying time. Italics – Pole position earned by points standings or practice time. * – Most laps led.)

ARCA Menards Series East

ARCA Menards Series West

References

External links
 
 

1999 births
Living people
ARCA Menards Series drivers
NASCAR drivers
CARS Tour drivers
Racing drivers from Charlotte, North Carolina
Racing drivers from North Carolina
Sportspeople from Charlotte, North Carolina
JR Motorsports drivers
High Point University alumni